In the Presence of Mine Enemies is a 1997 Showtime TV movie about the Warsaw Ghetto Uprising in World War II.

The film is a remake of an original TV drama scripted by Rod Serling for Playhouse 90, titled In the Presence of Mine Enemies, starring Charles Laughton.

The plot centres on a rabbi (played in the 1997 version by Armin Mueller-Stahl), and his children (Elina Lowensohn and Don McKellar). The movie also features Charles Dance as a German officer, and introducing Jason Schwartz as Israel leader of the orphan rebellion.

References

External links
 

1997 films
American television films
Holocaust films
Films with screenplays by Rod Serling